Ixia may refer to:

 Ixia, a genus of cormous plants native to South Africa
 Ialysos, a resort town on the island of Rhodes
 Ixia (company), an IP networking and communications company

See also
 Ixias, a genus of butterfly